Patrin may refer to:
 Patrin, symbol or signpost left for later travellers in Romani culture
 Eugène Patrin,  French mineralogist and naturalist.